Dago Thim Secondary School is a Kenyan school located in the Nyahera village in the Ksumu North ward of the Kisumu Town West Constituency of Kisumu County, Nyanza Province.

See also

 Education in Kenya
 List of schools in Kenya

References
http://www.kcse-online.info/kcse%208/education%20275.html
https://web.archive.org/web/20131227091047/http://educatekenya.org/dago-thim-secondary-school/

Educational institutions with year of establishment missing
Education in Nyanza Province
Kisumu County
High schools and secondary schools in Kenya